The 2022–23 Cal State Fullerton Titans men's basketball team represents California State University, Fullerton in the 2022–23 NCAA Division I men's basketball season. The Titans, led by 10th-year head coach Dedrique Taylor, play their home games at Titan Gym as members of the Big West Conference.

Previous season 

The Titans finished the 2021–22 season 21–11 overall, 11–4 in Big West play to finish in second place. The Titans won the Big West tournament championship by defeating UC Davis, Hawaii, and Long Beach State. As a result, the Titans received the conference's automatic bid to the NCAA tournament as the No. 15 seed in the West region. They lost to No. 2-seeded Duke in the first round.

Roster

Schedule and results 

|-
!colspan=9 style=| Exhibition

|-
!colspan=9 style=| Non-conference regular season

|-
!colspan=9 style=| Big West regular season

|-
!colspan=12 style=| Big West tournament

Source:

References 

Cal State Fullerton Titans men's basketball seasons
Cal State Fullerton
Cal State Fullerton
Cal State Fullerton